A unary function is a function that takes one argument. A unary operator belongs to a subset of unary functions, in that its range coincides with its domain. In contrast, a unary function's domain may or may not coincide with its range.

Examples 

The successor function, denoted , is a unary operator. Its domain and codomain are the natural numbers, its definition is as follows:

Many of the elementary functions are unary functions, including the trigonometric functions, logarithm with a specified base, exponentiation to a particular power or  base, and hyperbolic functions.

See also

Arity
Binary function
Binary operator
List of mathematical functions
Ternary operation
Unary operation

References
 Foundations of Genetic Programming

Functions and mappings
Types of functions